Vyacheslav Nikolayevich Verushkin (born 7 September 1989) is a former Russian professional football player.

Club career
He played in the Russian Football National League for FC Mordovia Saransk in 2007.

External links
 
 

1989 births
People from Saransk
Living people
Russian footballers
Association football defenders
FC Mordovia Saransk players
FC Salyut Belgorod players
FC Nosta Novotroitsk players
FC Volga Ulyanovsk players
Sportspeople from Mordovia